is a dam in the Gunma Prefecture of Japan; it supports a 240 MW hydroelectric power station.

References

Dams in Gunma Prefecture
Dams completed in 1967